This article presents the discography of American band Kool & the Gang.

Albums

Studio albums

Live albums

Compilation albums

Singles

Notes

References

External links

Discography
Discographies of American artists
Pop music group discographies
Rhythm and blues discographies
Soul music discographies
Funk music discographies
Disco discographies